WASP-76, also known as BD+01 316, is a yellow-white main sequence star in the constellation of Pisces. Since 2014, it has had one suspected stellar companion at a projected separation of 85 astronomical units.

Planetary system 

The "hot Jupiter" class planet WASP-76b was discovered around WASP-76 in 2013.

References

External links 
 WASP-76 in exoplanet.eu
 WASP-76 на сайте Планетные системы

Planetary systems with one confirmed planet
Pisces (constellation)
F-type main-sequence stars
Planetary transit variables
Durchmusterung objects